Negi is a surname of  Pahadi Rajput caste  found in the Indian states of Uttarakhand and Himachal Pradesh. 

Notable people with this surname include:
Dhan Singh Negi, Former MLA for Tehri
Darwan Singh Negi, Victoria Cross recipient
Gabar Singh Negi, Victoria Cross recipient
Asha Negi, television actress
Jagat Singh Negi, politician
Janardan Ganpatrao Negi, scientist
Jeet Singh Negi, composer
Kunwar Singh Negi, Braille editor and social worker
Mir Ranjan Negi, former national field hockey player for India
Nalini Negi, television actress and model
Narender Negi, cricketer
Narendra Singh Negi, Garhwali folk singer
Parimarjan Negi, chess grandmaster
Pawan Negi, Indian international cricket player
S. K. S. Negi, army officer
Shyam Saran Negi, Indian school teacher and ECI ambassador
Dev Negi, singer
Deependra Negi, footballer
Pramod Negi, From Pauri

Negi (written: 根木) is also a Japanese surname. Notable people with the surname include:

, Japanese footballer

References

Indian surnames
Japanese-language surnames